Brandon Friesen is an American, Grammy Award nominated and multi-Juno Award winning music producer, audio engineer, mixer, and television producer. He was born in Minneapolis, Minnesota and spent several years living and working in Canada before relocating permanently to Los Angeles, California. His current companies include record label Blue Cadillac Music with partner Billy Ray Cyrus, Arbor Television, and C12 Records (distributed by EMI Music Canada).

In 2007 Brandon developed a TV production company known as "Arbor Television" with offices in Hollywood and Canada.  Arbor TV produces the acclaimed music/comedy variety series “Arbor Live” which has run for 3 seasons and has featured artists such as Mötley Crüe, Buck Cherry, The Stray Cats, Velvet Revolver, Fishbone, Staind, Slayer, Mother Mother, Joe Satriani, Papa Roach, Comeback Kid and numerous other internationally acclaimed bands.  Further, Brandon co-produced the successful reality show titled “LAX” which was broadcast on Viva, MTV, Nickelodeon, and Pro7 in Europe. Arbor Television produced European network Bravo's "The Best Of Bravo" in 2010 which featured appearances by celebrities such as Justin Bieber, Miley Cyrus, Kesha, Zac Efron, Taylor Lautner, Selena Gomez, and more, as well as various production co-ventures with Bravo, MTV, Nickelodeon, CBC and several other respected networks around the world.

Brandon Friesen founded Arbor Records in 1999, which was recognized as one of Canada's Top Ten Most Influential Independent Record Labels by Applaud Magazine in 2004. It was distributed by EMI Music Canada and Allegro Music Corporation in addition to various other distributors around the world. Brandon Friesen sold this company in 2012 to Redsmoke Records. He maintains a Canadian rock label distributed by EMI Music Canada "C12 Records", and recently founded "Blue Cadillac Music" with partner Billy Ray Cyrus. Blue Cadillac Music debuted by releasing a new song for free download by Billy Ray Cyrus on Father's Day, 2012 entitled, "That's What Daddy.s Do".

As a producer, mixing engineer, and audio engineer, Brandon Friesen's career has spanned over 15 years. In 2006 Friesen was honored for a second time as “Engineer of the Year” at the WCMA Awards, prevailing over a number of highly respected engineers such as Randy Staub (Metallica, Nickelback). He engineered and mixed the Power97 sessions, which include acoustic performances by Nickelback, Sum 41, Everlast, Seether, Staind, Finger Eleven, Three Days Grace, and more.

Discography

E=engineered
M=mixed
P=produced
CoW=cowrote

 54-40 Ocean Pearl - Power Sessions SonyBMG E/M
 All Man Kind All Man Kind (Indie) M
 Atlantis Awaits (Universal) P/E/M
 Bif Naked Love Myself Today - Power Sessions (Universal) E/M
 Billy Ray Cyrus Change My Mind (Blue Cadillac Music) P/E/M
 Billy Talent This is how it goes - Power Sessions (Atlantic) E/M
 Chantal KreviazukA Man Needs A Maid - Neal Young Tribute (Sony/BMG) P/E/M
 Collective Soul Shine - Power Sessions (El Music) E/M
 ComeBack Kid Through The Noise (Victory) E/M
 ComeBack Kid Broadcasting (Victory) E
 Cranston Foundation Communicate (Indie) P/E/M
 Danko Jones The Sound of Love - Power Sessions (Aquarius) E/M
 Derek Miller Music Is The Medicine (Arbor)/EMI P/E/M
 Derek Miller The Dirty Looks (Arbor)/EMI P/E/M
 Domenica The Luxury feat. Marcos Curiel (P.O.D) (C12/EMI, Rodeostar/Sony, Spinning Inc.) P/E/M/CoW
 Domenica The Better In Us All (C12/EMI, Rodeostar/Sony, Spinning Inc.) P/E/M
 Dreadnaut A Taste of What's To Come (PHD) P/E/M
 Euphoria Audio (Indie) P/E/M
 Everlast What It's Like, Broken - Power Sessions (Island) E/M
 Finger Eleven One Thing - Power Sessions (Wind-Up) E/M
 Floor Thirteen Mmmm! (C12/EMI) P/E/M
 Forty Foot Echo Save Me - Power Sessions (Hollywood) E/M
 Jeff Healey Band While My Guitar..featuring George Harrison, Geoff Lynn (EMI) M
 Jet Set Satellite Vegas (Fusion 3) P/E/MKO
 Kapaches Suntan In Hell (Atlantic) M
 Lives of Many Until We Lay This To Rest (PHD) P/E/M
 Lives of Many The Sweet Art of Deceiving (PHD) P/E/M
 Nickelback Leader of Men, How You Remind Me - Power 97 Sessions (Roadrunner) E/M
 Paper Moon One Thousand Reasons to Stay (Endearing) P/E/M
 Paper Moon Broken Hearts Break Faster Everyday (Endearing) P/E/M
 Port Amoral Villans (Roadrunner) P/E/M
 Powderfinger Sunsets - Power Sessions (Polydor/Universal) E/M
 Projektor Red Wolf Glass (Endearing) P/E/M
 Projektor Young Hearts Fail (Endearing) P/E/M
 Rob Reynolds Coming Home (IHM/Universal)I P/E/M/CoW
 Seether Fine, Driven Under - Power Sessions (Wind-Up) E/M
 Staind Outside - Power Sessions (Atlantic) E/M
 Steeple Chaser Standing of the Verge (C12/EMI) P/E/M/CoW
 Stevie Salas Be What It Is (Sony Japan) E/M
 Stoic Frame Justicia (Navarre/Universal) P/E/M
 Stone Sour Come What May (Roadrunner) E/M
 Sum 41 Over My Head - Power Sessions (Island) M
 Sylvie An Electric Trace (Smallman/Warner) P/E/M
 Sylvie Trees and Shade Are Our Only Fences (Smallman/Warner) E
 Syndicate Syndicate (Sony Music) P/E/M
 The Harlots Crawl Spaces (Universal) P/E/M
 The Harlots Connoisseur of Ruin (Universal) P/E/M
 The Music The People - Power Sessions (Capital) E/M
 The Red Paintings The Revolution is Never Coming (Indie) M
 The Screaming Jets Do Ya (Sony/BMG Australia) M
 The Tea Party Messenger - Power Sessions (EMI) E/M
 The Trews Not Ready to Go - Power Sessions (SonyBMG) E/M
 The Watchmen Holiday - Power Sessions (EMI) E/M
 Three Days Grace Wake Up - Power Sessions (Jive) E/M
 Tinfoil Phoenix Living In The Shadow of the Bat Roadrunner P/E/M
 Tinfoil Phoenix Age of Vipers (C4/Koch) P/E/M
 Waking Eyes Taking The Hard Way - Power Sessions (Warner) E/M

References

External links
 Brandon Friesen's Website
 

Year of birth missing (living people)
Living people
Record producers from Minnesota
American television producers